TRE3S is the third studio album by Chikita Violenta, released in early 2011, to a mix of mild and enthusiastic reviews.  Spin magazine gave the album 7 out of 10 stars, stating "While the production's scope doesn't quite fit Chikita Violenta's knack for scrappy Superchunk-style guitar pop, the busy shimmer usually complements the songs' energy instead of burying it."  Scott Fallon of the Bergen County Record gave it four out of four stars, calling it "the first great album of 2011," and, noting producer Newfeld's work with Broken Social Scene, wrote "Chikita Violenta has taken the whole lo-fi anthemic pop thing to heart."

Track listing

 "Roni"
 "All I Need's a Little More"
 "Tired"
 "Holiday"
 "The Pause"
 "ATPG"
 "The Monster (Was Last Seen Approaching the Power Plant)"
 "Siren"
 "España"
 "Supercycle"
 "My Connection"

References

External links
TRE3S on Arts & Crafts

2011 albums